Lyndhurst is a census-designated place (CDP) in Augusta County, Virginia, United States. The population was 1,490 at the 2010 census. It is part of the Staunton–Waynesboro Micropolitan Statistical Area.

Geography
Lyndhurst is located at  (38.026381, −78.951379).

According to the United States Census Bureau, the CDP has a total area of 6.1 square miles (15.8 km2), of which, 6.1 square miles (15.8 km2) of it is land and 0.16% is water.

Demographics
As of the census of 2000, there were 1,527 people, 580 households, and 447 families residing in the CDP. The population density was 250.6 people per square mile (96.8/km2). There were 602 housing units at an average density of 98.8/sq mi (38.2/km2). The racial makeup of the CDP was 93.12% White, 5.17% African American, 0.13% Native American, 0.26% Asian, 0.72% from other races, and 0.59% from two or more races. Hispanic or Latino of any race were 1.90% of the population.

There were 580 households, out of which 30.3% had children under the age of 18 living with them, 65.3% were married couples living together, 7.6% had a female householder with no husband present, and 22.9% were non-families. 19.8% of all households were made up of individuals, and 9.3% had someone living alone who was 65 years of age or older. The average household size was 2.61 and the average family size was 3.00.

In the CDP, the population was spread out, with 23.6% under the age of 18, 6.9% from 18 to 24, 27.3% from 25 to 44, 29.0% from 45 to 64, and 13.1% who were 65 years of age or older. The median age was 40 years. For every 100 females there were 96.5 males. For every 100 females age 18 and over, there were 96.6 males.

The median income for a household in the CDP was $45,165, and the median income for a family was $47,075. Males had a median income of $38,472 versus $20,640 for females. The per capita income for the CDP was $18,467. About 4.7% of families and 7.6% of the population were below the poverty line, including 10.7% of those under age 18 and 6.7% of those age 65 or over.

References

External links
 Local News

Census-designated places in Augusta County, Virginia